Judy is a soundtrack by Renée Zellweger for the film of the same name. It was released on September 28, 2019, by Decca Records. The album features songs performed by Zellweger in character as Judy Garland from the film along with duets with Sam Smith and Rufus Wainwright. The album received a nomination for the Grammy Award for Best Traditional Pop Vocal Album, with Zellweger as the recipient.

Track listing

Charts

References

2019 soundtrack albums
Decca Records soundtracks
Judy Garland tribute albums